The year 1994 was designated as the "International Year of the Family" and the "International Year of Sport and the Olympic Ideal" by the United Nations.

Events

January
 January 1 – The North American Free Trade Agreement (NAFTA) is established.
 January 8 – Soyuz TM-18: Valeri Polyakov begins his 437.7-day orbit of the Earth, eventually setting the world record for days spent in orbit.
 January 11 – The Irish government announces the end of a 15-year broadcasting ban on the Provisional Irish Republican Army and its political arm Sinn Féin.
 January 14 – U.S. President Bill Clinton and Russian President Boris Yeltsin sign the Kremlin accords, which stop the preprogrammed aiming of nuclear missiles toward each country's targets, and also provide for the dismantling of the nuclear arsenal in Ukraine.
 January 17 – The 6.7  Northridge earthquake strikes the Greater Los Angeles Area with a maximum Mercalli intensity of IX (Violent), leaving 57 people dead and more than 8,700 injured.
 January 19 – Record cold temperatures hit the eastern United States. The coldest temperature ever measured in Indiana state history, −36 °F (−38 °C), is recorded in New Whiteland, Indiana.

February 
 February 3
 In the aftermath of the Chadian–Libyan conflict, the International Court of Justice rules that the Aouzou Strip belongs to the Republic of Chad.
 (136617) 1994 CC is discovered.
 February 5 – Byron De La Beckwith is convicted of the 1963 murder of civil rights leader Medgar Evers.
 February 6 – Markale massacres: a Bosnian Serb Army mortar shell kills 68 civilians and wounds about 200 in a Sarajevo marketplace.
 February 9 – The Vance–Owen peace plan for Bosnia and Herzegovina is announced.
 February 12
 Edvard Munch's painting The Scream is stolen in Oslo (it is recovered on May 7).
 The 1994 Winter Olympics begin in Lillehammer.
 February 21 – Revealing of the first photo of Pluto and its moon Charon taken from the Hubble Space Telescope.
 February 24 – In Gloucester, local police begin excavations at 25 Cromwell Street, the home of Fred West, a suspect in multiple murders. On February 28, he and his wife are arrested.
 February 25 – Israeli Kahanist Baruch Goldstein opens fire inside the Cave of the Patriarchs in the West Bank; he kills 29 Muslims before worshippers beat him to death.
 February 28 – Four United States F-16s shoot down four Serbian J-21s over Bosnia and Herzegovina for violation of the Operation Deny Flight and its no-fly zone.

March
 March – The People's Republic of China gets its first connection to the Internet. 
 March 1 – Walvis Bay is handed over to Namibia by South Africa.
 March 6 – A referendum in Moldova results in the electorate voting against possible reunification with Romania.
 March 8 – Nine Inch Nails' second studio album, The Downward Spiral, is released to critical acclaim.
 March 12
 A photo by Marmaduke Wetherell, previously touted as "proof" of the Loch Ness Monster, is confirmed to be a hoax.
 The Church of England ordains its first female priests.
 March 14 
 Apple Computer, Inc. releases the Power Macintosh, the first Macintosh computers to use the new PowerPC microprocessors.
 The Linux kernel version 1.0.0 is released after over two years of development.
 March 15 – U.S. troops are withdrawn from Somalia.
 March 20 – Italian journalist Ilaria Alpi and TV cameraman Miran Hrovatin are assassinated in Somalia.
 March 21 – The 66th Academy Awards, hosted by Whoopi Goldberg, are held at the Dorothy Chandler Pavilion in Los Angeles. Steven Spielberg's Holocaust drama Schindler's List wins seven Oscars including Best Picture and Best Director (Spielberg).
 March 23 
 Green Ramp disaster: two military aircraft collide over Pope Air Force Base, North Carolina causing 24 fatalities.
 Mexican presidential candidate Luis Donaldo Colosio is assassinated at a campaign rally in Tijuana.
 March 27
 TV tycoon Silvio Berlusconi's right-wing coalition wins the Italian general election.
 The biggest tornado outbreak in 1994 occurs in the southeastern United States; one tornado kills 22 people at the Goshen United Methodist Church in Piedmont, Alabama.
 March 28 – Shell House massacre: Inkatha Freedom Party and ANC supporters battle in central Johannesburg, South Africa.
 March 31 – The journal Nature reports the finding in Ethiopia of the first complete Australopithecus afarensis skull.

April

 April 2 – The National Convention of New Sudan of the SPLA/M opens in Chukudum.
 April 5 – Kurt Cobain, the lead singer of Nirvana, commits suicide at age 27 at his home in Seattle. His body was found three days later.
 April 6 – Rwandan President Juvénal Habyarimana and Burundi President Cyprien Ntaryamira die when a missile shoots down their jet near Kigali, Rwanda. This is taken as a pretext to begin the Rwandan genocide.
 April 7 – The Rwandan genocide begins in Kigali, Rwanda.
 April 16 – Voters in Finland decide to join the European Union in a referendum.
 April 20 – South Africa adopts a new national flag, replacing the "Oranje, Blanje, Blou" flag adopted in 1928 that was used during apartheid.
 April 21 – The Red Cross estimates that hundreds of thousands of Tutsi have been killed in Rwanda.
 April 25 – Sultan Azlan Muhibbudin Shah ibni Almarhum Sultan Yusuff Izzudin Shah Ghafarullahu-lahu ends his term as the 9th Yang di-Pertuan Agong of Malaysia.
 April 26
 Tuanku Jaafar ibni Almarhum Tuanku Abdul Rahman, Yang di-Pertuan Besar of Negeri Sembilan, becomes the 10th Yang di-Pertuan Agong of Malaysia.
 China Airlines Flight 140, an Airbus A300, crashes while landing at Nagoya, Japan, killing 264 people.
 April 27 – South Africa holds its first fully multiracial elections, marking the final end of the last vestiges of apartheid. Nelson Mandela wins the elections and is sworn in as the first democratically elected president the following month.

May
 May 1 – Three-time Formula One world champion Ayrton Senna is killed in an accident during the San Marino Grand Prix in Imola, Italy.
 May 5 – The Bishkek Protocol between Armenia and Azerbaijan is signed in Bishkek, Kyrgyzstan, effectively freezing the Nagorno-Karabakh conflict.
 May 6 – The Channel Tunnel, which took 15,000 workers more than seven years to complete, opens between England and France, enabling passengers to travel between the two countries in 35 minutes.
 May 10
 Nelson Mandela is inaugurated as South Africa's first black president.
 The Pinkenba Six, including future political candidate Mark Ellis, kidnap 3 Indigenous children in Fortitude Valley, Brisbane.
 Serial Killer John Wayne Gacy is executed by lethal injection in the Stateville Correctional Center.
 Serial Killer Jeffery Dahmer is baptised in prison.
 A solar eclipse occurs in The United States
 May 17 – Malawi holds its first multiparty elections.
 May 18 – The Flavr Savr, a genetically modified tomato, is deemed safe for consumption by the FDA, becoming the first commercially grown genetically engineered food to be granted a license for human consumption.
 May 20 – After a funeral in Cluny Parish Church, Edinburgh attended by 900 people and after which 3,000 people lined the streets, John Smith is buried in a private family funeral on the island of Iona, at the sacred burial ground of Reilig Odhráin, which contains the graves of several Scottish kings as well as monarchs of Ireland, Norway and France.
 May 22 – Pope John Paul II issues the Apostolic Letter Ordinatio sacerdotalis from the Vatican, expounding the Catholic Church's position requiring "the reservation of priestly ordination to men alone".
May 26 - Michael Jackson marries Lisa Marie Presley in the Dominican Republic.

June 
 June 1 – The Republic of South Africa rejoins the Commonwealth of Nations after the first democratic election; South Africa had departed the then-British Commonwealth in 1961.
 June 6–June 8 – Ceasefire negotiations for the Yugoslav War begin in Geneva; they agree to a one-month cessation of hostilities (which does not last more than a few days).
 June 12 – Nicole Brown Simpson and Ronald Lyle Goldman are murdered outside the Simpson home in Los Angeles. O. J. Simpson is later acquitted of the killings, but is held liable in a civil suit.
 June 15
 Israel and the Vatican establish full diplomatic relations.
 The Lion King, the highest-grossing hand-drawn animated film of all time, is released by Walt Disney Feature Animation.
 June 17
 NFL star O. J. Simpson and his friend Al Cowlings flee from police in a white Ford Bronco. The low-speed chase ends at Simpson's Brentwood, Los Angeles mansion, where he surrenders.
 The 1994 FIFA World Cup starts in the United States.
 June 23 – NASA's Space Station Processing Facility, a new state-of-the-art manufacturing building for the International Space Station, officially opens at Kennedy Space Center.
 June 25 – Cold War: the last Russian troops leave Germany.
 June 26 – Microsoft announces it will no longer sell or support the MS-DOS operating system separately from Microsoft Windows.
 June 28 – Members of the Aum Shinrikyo cult execute the first sarin gas attack at Matsumoto, Japan, killing eight and injuring 200.
 June 30 – An Airbus A330 crashes during a test flight near Toulouse, France, where Airbus is based, killing the seven-person crew. The test was meant to simulate an engine failure at low speed with maximum angle of climb.
 June 30
 The Liberal Democratic Party in Japan regained power after spent 11 months of opposition, with the coalition with Japanese Socialist Party.
 Tropical Storm Alberto forms, hitting parts of Florida causing $1.03 billion in damage and 32 deaths.

July

 July 2 – Colombian footballer Andrés Escobar, 27, is shot dead in Medellín. His murder is commonly attributed as retaliation for the own goal Escobar scored in the 1994 FIFA World Cup against the United States soccer team.
 July 4 – Rwandan Patriotic Front troops capture Kigali, a major breakthrough in the Rwandan Civil War.
 July 5 – Jeff Bezos founds Amazon.
 July 7 – 1994 civil war in Yemen: Aden is occupied by troops from North Yemen.
 July 8 – North Korean President Kim Il-sung dies, but officially continues to hold office.
 July 12 – The Allied occupation of Berlin ends with a casing of the colors ceremony attended by U.S. President Bill Clinton.
 July 16–22 – Fragments of Comet Shoemaker–Levy 9 impact the planet Jupiter.
 July 17 – Brazil wins the 1994 FIFA World Cup, defeating Italy 3–2 in a penalty shootout in the final (full-time 0–0).
 July 18
 AMIA bombing: In Buenos Aires, a terrorist attack destroys a building housing several Jewish organizations, killing 85 and injuring many more.
 Rwandan Patriotic Front troops capture Gisenyi, forcing the interim government into Zaire and ending the Rwandan genocide.
 July 25 – Israel and Jordan sign the Washington Declaration as a preliminary to signature on October 25 of the Israel–Jordan peace treaty, which formally ends the state of war that has existed between the nations since 1948.

August

 August 5 – Groups of protesters spread from Havana, Cuba's Castillo de la Punta ("Point Castle"), creating the first protests against Fidel Castro's government since 1959.
August 11 – The formation of Hurricane John which would go one to become the longest-lasting tropical cyclone recorded worldwide.  It would dissipate on September 13th, lasting a little over 31 days.
 August 12
 Woodstock '94 begins in Saugerties, New York. It is the 25-year anniversary of Woodstock in 1969.
 All Major League Baseball players go on strike, beginning the longest work stoppage in the sport's history.
August 16 – The release of the IBM Simon smartphone, being the first ever commercially available smartphone.
 August 18 - 1994 Mascara earthquake. A 5.8 earthquake lefts 171 dead in Algeria.
 August 31
 The Troubles: The Provisional Irish Republican Army announces a "complete cessation of military operations" as part of the Northern Ireland peace process. This would temporarily end in 1996 with the Docklands bombing in England before a definite ceasefire in 1997. In 1998, the Good Friday Agreement was signed and the IRA decommissioned their weapons in 2005 
 The Russian Army leaves Estonia and Latvia, ending the last traces of Eastern Europe's Soviet occupation.

September
 September 3 – Cold War: Russia and the People's Republic of China agree to de-target their nuclear weapons against each other.
 September 5 – New South Wales State MP for Cabramatta John Newman is shot outside his home, in Australia's first political assassination since 1977.
 September 8 – USAir Flight 427, a Boeing 737 with 132 people on board, crashes on approach to Pittsburgh International Airport killing all on board. 
 September 13 – President Bill Clinton signs the Federal Assault Weapons Ban, which bans the manufacture of new firearms with certain features for a period of 10 years.
 September 14 – The 1994 World Series is officially cancelled due to the ongoing work stoppage. It is the first time a World Series will not be played since 1904.
 September 16
 Danish tour guide Louise Jensen is abducted, raped and murdered by three British soldiers in Cyprus.
 Britain lifts the broadcasting ban imposed on Sinn Féin and paramilitary groups from Northern Ireland.
 September 17 – Heather Whitestone is crowned the first deaf Miss America; she is crowned Miss America 1995.
 September 19 
U.S. troops stage a bloodless invasion of Haiti to restore the legitimately elected leader, Jean-Bertrand Aristide, to power.
Andrew Wiles proves Fermat's Last Theorem, solving the 357-year-old mathematical theorem first proposed by Pierre de Fermat in 1637. He would publish it in 1995.
 September 28
 The car ferry MS Estonia sinks in the Baltic Sea, killing 852 people.
 José Francisco Ruiz Massieu, Mexican politician, is assassinated on orders of Raúl Salinas de Gortari.
 September – Mohammed Omar would found the Taliban movement in his home town of Kandahar, Afghanistan.
September–October – Iraq disarmament crisis: Iraq threatens to stop cooperating with UNSCOM inspectors and begins to once again deploy troops near its border with Kuwait. In response, the U.S. begins to deploy troops to Kuwait.

October 
 October 1
 In Slovakia, populist leader Vladimír Mečiar wins the general election.
 Palau gains independence from the United Nations Trusteeship Council.
The World Wide Web Consortium is founded by Tim Berners-Lee, becoming the main international standards organization for the World Wide Web.
 October 4 – In Switzerland, 23 members of the Order of the Solar Temple cult are found dead, a day after 25 of their fellow cultists are similarly discovered in Morin-Heights, Quebec.
 October 7 - Ingvar Carlsson returns as Prime Minister of Sweden .
 October 8 – Iraq disarmament crisis: The President of the United Nations Security Council says that Iraq must withdraw its troops from the Kuwait border, and immediately cooperate with weapons inspectors.
 October 12 – NASA loses radio contact with the Magellan spacecraft as the probe descends into the thick atmosphere of Venus (the spacecraft presumably burned up in the atmosphere either October 13 or October 14).
 October 15
 After three years of U.S. exile, Haiti's president Aristide returns to his country.
 Iraq disarmament crisis: following threats by the U.N. Security Council and the U.S., Iraq withdraws troops from its border with Kuwait.

November 
 November 5
 A letter by former U.S. President Ronald Reagan, announcing that he has Alzheimer's disease, is released.
 George Foreman wins the WBA and IBF World Heavyweight Championships by KO'ing Michael Moorer becoming the oldest heavyweight champion in history.
 Influential Afrikaner theologian and critic of apartheid Johan Heyns is assassinated; the killers are never apprehended or identified.
 November 6 
 A flood in Piedmont, Italy, kills dozens of people.
 Bražuolė bridge bombing in Lithuania damages a railway bridge but trains are stopped in time to avoid casualties.
 November 7 – WXYC, the student radio station of the University of North Carolina at Chapel Hill, provides the world's first internet radio broadcast.
 November 8 
 Georgia Representative Newt Gingrich leads the United States Republican Party in taking control of both the House of Representatives and the Senate in midterm congressional elections, the first time in 40 years the Republicans secure control of both houses of Congress. George W. Bush is elected Governor of Texas.
 Hurricane Gordon hits Central America, Jamaica, Cuba, the Bahamas, Haiti and the Southeastern United States, causing $594 million in damages and 1,152 fatalities.
 November 11 – Duy Tan University, Vietnam's University, was established. 
 November 13
 Voters in Sweden decide to join the European Union in a referendum.
 The first passengers travel through the Channel Tunnel.
Dale Earnhardt wins his 7th and final NASCAR championship.
 November 15 – 1994 Nepalese general election — The CPN (UML) is a elected with a minority government, becoming the first democratically elected Communist party in Asia.
 November 16 – A federal judge issues a temporary restraining order, prohibiting the State of California from implementing Proposition 187, that would have denied most public services to illegal aliens.
 November 20 – The Angolan government and UNITA rebels sign the Lusaka Protocol.
 November 27 – According to Chinese government official confirmed report, a Fuxin Yiyuan dance hall caught fire in Liaoning Province, China, killing 233 persons, another 71 persons were rescued.
 November 28 – Voters in Norway decide not to join the European Union in a referendum.
 November 30 – The Italian cruise ship Achille Lauro catches fire in the Indian Ocean off the coast of Somalia with nearly a thousand passengers and crew aboard. After unsuccessful attempts by the crew to extinguish the fire, the vessel is evacuated and sinks two days later. During the evacuation, two die and eight are wounded.

December 
 December 1 – Ernesto Zedillo takes office as President of Mexico.
 December 2 – The Australian government agrees to pay reparations to indigenous Australians who were displaced during the nuclear tests at Maralinga in the 1950s and 1960s.
 December 3 
Sony releases the PlayStation video game system in Japan; it will sell over 100 million units worldwide by the time it is discontinued in 2006.
Taiwan holds its first full local elections: James Soong is elected as the first and only directly-elected Governor of Taiwan; Chen Shui-bian becomes the first direct elected Mayor of Taipei; Wu Den-yih becomes the first directly-elected Mayor of Kaohsiung.
 December 11 – Russian president Boris Yeltsin orders troops into Chechnya.
 December 13
 The trial of former President Mengistu begins in Ethiopia.
 Fred West, 53, a builder living in Gloucester, UK, is remanded in custody, charged with murdering 12 people (including two of his own daughters) whose bodies are mostly found buried at his house in Cromwell Street. His wife Rosemary West, 41, is charged with 10 murders.
 December 14 – Construction commences on the Three Gorges Dam, at Sandouping, China.
December 15 – The initial release of Netscape Navigator, a web browser that will control the majority of the usage share for web browsers for the rest of the 1990s.
 December 19
 A planned exchange rate correction of the Mexican peso to the US dollar, becomes a massive financial meltdown in Mexico, unleashing the 'Tequila' effect on global financial markets. This prompts a US$50 billion "bailout" by the Clinton administration.
 Civil unions between same-sex couples are legalized in Sweden.
 December 31 – This date is skipped by the Phoenix Islands to switch from the UTC−11 time zone to UTC+13, and by the Line Islands to switch from UTC−10 to UTC+14. The latter becomes the earliest time zone in the world, one full day ahead of Hawaii.

Date unknown
 Fundación Arco Iris – a Catholic NGO is founded in Bolivia.
 Pyroclastic flows – clouds of scalding gas, pumice, and ash – rapidly descend an erupting Mount Merapi volcano in central Java, causing sixty deaths.
 Online service America Online offers gateway to World Wide Web for the first time. This marked the beginning of easy accessibility of the Web to the average person in the U.S.
 The population of Nigeria exceeds 100 million, making it the first African state to have a population above 100 million.

Births

January
 January 1 – Emilie Hegh Arntzen, Norwegian handball player
 January 3 – Isaquias Queiroz, Brazilian sprint canoeist 
 January 4 – Viktor Axelsen, Danish badminton player
 January 5 – Zemgus Girgensons, Latvian ice hockey player
 January 6 – Catriona Gray, Filipino-Australian model, singer and pageant titleholder won Miss Universe 2018
 January 7 – Lee Sun-bin, South Korean actress and singer
 January 10 – Faith Kipyegon, Kenyan middle-distance runner
 January 11 – Desirae Krawczyk, American tennis player
 January 12 – Emre Can, German footballer
 January 14
 Muktar Edris, Ethiopian long-distance runner
 Kai, South Korean singer
 January 17 – Lucy Boynton, American-British actress
 January 18 
 Minzy, South Korean singer, rapper and dancer
 Jiyoung, South Korean singer and actress
 January 19 – Matthias Ginter, German footballer
 January 20 – Hampus Lindholm, Swedish ice hockey player
 January 21 – Booboo Stewart, American actor
 January 25 – Willow Nightingale, American professional wrestler
 January 28 – Maluma, Colombian singer
 February 1 
 Julia Garner, American actress
 Harry Styles, English singer
 February 3 – Malaika Mihambo, German athlete

February
 February 1 – Luke Saville, Australian tennis player
 February 6 – Charlie Heaton, English actor
 February 8 – Hakan Çalhanoğlu, Turkish footballer
 February 10 - Seulgi, South Korean singer
 February 12 – Arman Hall, American sprinter
 February 13 – Memphis Depay, Dutch footballer
 February 14 
 Becky Hill, British singer
 Petchmorakot Petchyindee Academy, Thai Muay Thai kickboxer and former ONE Featherweight Muay Thai World Champion
 February 16
 Federico Bernardeschi, Italian footballer
 Ava Max, American singer
 February 18 
 J-Hope, South Korean rapper and songwriter
 Gabriela Schloesser, Mexican born-Dutch archer
 February 20 – Brigid Kosgei, Kenyan marathon runner
 February 21 – Wendy, South Korean singer
 February 23
 Dakota Fanning, American actress and fashion model
 Lucas Pouille, French tennis player
 Little Simz, English rapper
 February 24 – Jessica Pegula, American tennis player
 February 25 – Eugenie Bouchard, Canadian tennis player
 February 26 - Jacob Trouba, American Ice Hockey Player 
 February 27 – Hou Yifan, Chinese chess player
 February 28 – Arkadiusz Milik, Polish footballer

March 
 March 1
 Justin Bieber, Canadian singer
 Tyreek Hill, American football player
 March 2 – Nikkie de Jager, Dutch makeup artist and beauty vlogger
 March 5 – Daria Gavrilova, Russian-Australian tennis player
 March 7
 Chase Kalisz, American swimmer
 Jordan Pickford, English footballer
 March 10 
 Bad Bunny, Puerto Rican singer
 Nikita Parris, English footballer
 March 11 − Andrew Robertson, Scottish footballer
 March 12
 Katie Archibald, Scottish track cyclist
 Jerami Grant, American basketball player
 Christina Grimmie, American singer (d. 2016)
 Carlos Ramírez, Colombian BMX cyclist
 March 14 – Ansel Elgort, American actor, singer, and DJ
 March 15 – Georgia Taylor-Brown, British triathlete
 March 16 – Joel Embiid, Cameroonian basketball player
 March 18 – Megan Tapper, Jamaican hurdler
 March 20 – R'Bonney Gabriel, American beauty pageant titleholder who was crowned as Miss USA 2022, and as Miss Universe 2022.
 March 22 – Douglas Santos, Brazilian footballer
 March 24 – Giulia Steingruber, Swiss artistic gymnast
 March 26 – Mayu Watanabe, Japanese singer
 March 29 – Sulli, South Korean singer, songwriter, actress and model (d. 2019)
 March 30 – Jetro Willems, Dutch footballer

April 
 April 3 
 Feng Bin, Chinese discus thrower
 Srbuk, Armenian singer
 April 5 – Nicolas Tournat, French handball player
 April 6 – Jasmine Curtis-Smith, Filipina-Australian actress
 April 9 – Rosamaria Montibeller, Brazilian volleyball player
 April 11
 Duncan Laurence, Dutch singer
 Dakota Blue Richards, English actress
 April 12
 Eric Bailly, Ivorian footballer
 Oh Se-hun, South Korean singer
 Saoirse Ronan, United States-born Irish actress
 April 14 
 Pauline Ranvier, French fencer
 Skyler Samuels, American actress
 April 15 – Shaunae Miller-Uibo, Bahamian track and field sprinter
 April 18 – Moisés Arias, actor
 April 20 – Alexander Massialas, American fencer
 April 21 –  Gulnaz Khatuntseva, Russian cyclist
 April 22 – Maria Verschoor, Dutch field hockey player
 April 24 – Jordan Fisher, American actor
 April 25 – Omar McLeod, Jamaican hurdler
 April 29 – Valériane Vukosavljević, French basketball player

May
 May 1 
 Khamzat Chimaev, Russian born-Swedish mixed martial artist and professional wrestler
 Jóhan Hansen, Danish handball player
 May 2 – Alexander Choupenitch, Czech fencer
 May 4 – Zhu Yaming, Chinese triple jumper
 May 6 
 Mateo Kovačić, Croatian footballer
 Juan Musso, Argentine footballer
 May 8 – Zach Tinker, American actor
 May 14 
 Pernille Blume, Danish swimmer
 Marquinhos, Brazilian footballer
 May 17 – Julie Anne San Jose, Filipina singer-songwriter
 May 19 – Gabriela Guimarães, Brazilian volleyball player
 May 20 – Piotr Zieliński, Polish footballer
 May 21 – Tom Daley, British diver
 May 22 
 Athena Manoukian, Greek born-Armenian singer
 Miho Takagi, Japanese speed skater
 May 24
 Dimash Kudaibergen, Kazakh singer, songwriter, and multi-instrumentalist
 Jarell Martin, American basketball player
 Emma McKeon, Australian swimmer
 Daiya Seto, Japanese swimmer
 May 25 – Aly Raisman, American gymnast and model
 May 27 
 João Cancelo, Portuguese footballer
 Aymeric Laporte, French born-Spanish footballer
 May 28
 Son Yeon-jae, South Korean rhythmic gymnast
 John Stones, English footballer

June 
 June 8 – Song Yoo-jung, South Korean actress and model (d. 2021)  
 June 9 – Lee Hye-ri, South Korean singer and actress 
 June 10 – Cheung Ka Long, Hong Kong foil fencer
 June 11
 Ivana Baquero, Spanish actress
 Jessica Fox, Australian canoeist
 June 14 – Moon Taeil, South Korean singer
 June 15 
 Vincent Janssen, Dutch footballer
 Lee Kiefer, American fencer
 June 20 – Sarah Köhler, German swimmer
 June 22 - Klaudia Breś, Polish olympic athlete
 June 23 – HoYeon Jung, South Korean actress
 June 24 – Lily Williams, American cyclist
 June 25 – Lauren Price, Welsh boxer
 June 26 – Jessica Parratto, American diver
 June 28 
 Anish Giri, Russian born-Dutch chess grandmaster
 Hussein, Crown Prince of Jordan, heir apparent of Jordan
 June 29
 Camila Mendes, American actress
 Leandro Paredes, Argentinian footballer
 June 30
 Nate Hairston, American Football Player
 Joshua Rojas, American baseball player

July
 July 2 – Baba Rahman, Ghanaian footballer
 July 4 – Era Istrefi, Kosovar Albanian singer and songwriter
 July 5 
 Robin Gosens, German footballer
 Shohei Ohtani, Japanese baseball player
 July 7 – Ashton Irwin, Australian musician
 July 9 – Akiane Kramarik, American poet and painter
 July 11 
 Lucas Ocampos, Argentine footballer
 Jake Wightman, British middle distance runner
 July 12 
 Jamie Herrell, American born-Filipino actress and beauty queen
 Molly Seidel, American marathon runner
 July 14 – Jake Wightman, British middle distance runner
 July 16 – Torbjørn Bergerud, Norwegian handball player
 July 17
 Victor Lindelöf, Swedish footballer
 Benjamin Mendy, French footballer
 July 18 – Taylor Russell, Canadian actress
 July 25 – Bianka Buša, Serbian volleyball player
 July 27 
 Winnie Harlow, Canadian model
 Boyan Slat, Dutch CEO of The Ocean Cleanup
 Sándor Tótka, Hungarian canoeist
 July 31 – Liang Xinping, Chinese synchronised swimmer

August
 August 1 – Sayaka Hirota, Japanese badminton player
 August 2 – Tang Yuanting, Chinese badminton player
 August 8
 Lauv, American singer-songwriter
 Mirabai Chanu, Indian weightlifter
 August 10 – Bernardo Silva, Portuguese footballer
 August 11 – Song I-han, South Korean singer
 August 13 
 Joaquín Correa, Argentine footballer
 Filip Forsberg, Swedish ice hockey player
 Andrea Meza, Mexican model and beauty pageant titleholder who was crowned Miss Universe 2020
 August 15 
 Kosuke Hagino, Japanese swimmer
 Natalia Zabiiako, Estonian born-Russian pair skater
 August 17 – Taissa Farmiga, American actress
 August 18 – Madelaine Petsch, American actress
 August 19 
 Katja Salskov-Iversen, Danish sailor
 Nafissatou Thiam, Belgian athlete
 August 23 – Dara Howell, Canadian freestyle skier
 August 24 
 Kelsey Plum, American basketball player
 Breanna Stewart, American basketball player
 August 28 – Ons Jabeur, Tunisian tennis player
 August 30 – Kwon So-hyun, South Korean actress and singer

September
 September 1 – Bianca Ryan, American singer-songwriter
 September 5 – Gregorio Paltrinieri, Italian swimmer
 September 7 
 Elinor Barker, Welsh racing cyclist
 Kento Yamazaki, Japanese actor
 September 8 – Bruno Fernandes, Portuguese footballer
 September 10 – Mehdi Torabi, Iranian footballer
 September 12
 Mhairi Black, Scottish politician
 RM, South Korean rapper and songwriter
 Elina Svitolina, Ukrainian tennis player
 September 15 – Wout van Aert, Belgian road cyclist 
 September 16 
 Aleksandar Mitrović, Serbian footballer
 Mina Popović, Serbian volleyball player
 September 23 – Yerry Mina, Colombian footballer
 September 26 – Marcell Jacobs, Italian sprinter
 September 28 – Simon Hald, Danish handball player
 September 29
 Halsey, American singer
 Katarzyna Niewiadoma, Polish racing cyclist
 September 30
 Raphaël Coleman, English actor (d. 2020)
 Aliya Mustafina, Russian artistic gymnast

October
 October 1 
 Trézéguet, Egyptian footballer
 Arthur Van Doren, Belgian field hockey player
 October 8 – Luca Hänni, Swiss singer-songwriter 
 October 9 – Jodelle Ferland, Canadian actress
 October 10
 Jung Il-hoon, South Korean rapper, songwriter, and actor
 Bae Suzy, South Korean singer and actress
 October 12
 Sean Monahan, Canadian ice hockey player
 Olivia Smoliga, American swimmer
 October 17 – Alejandra Valencia, Mexican archer
 October 18 – Pascal Wehrlein, German-Mauritian racing driver
 October 22 – Alberta Santuccio, Italian fencer
 October 24 
 Krystal Jung, American-South Korean singer
 Sean O'Malley, American mixed artist fighter
 October 25 – Manzoor Pashteen, Pakistani human rights activist
 October 26 
 Matthew Hudson-Smith, British sprinter
 Daria Shmeleva, Russian track cyclist

November
 November 8 – Wang Yilyu, Chinese badminton player
 November 9 – Bence Penke, Hungarian voice actor
 November 10
 Takuma Asano, Japanese footballer
 Zoey Deutch, American actress
 Andre De Grasse, Canadian sprinter
 November 13 – Laurien Leurink, Dutch field hockey player
 November 16 
 Vilde Ingstad, Norwegian handball player
 Elena Tsagrinou, Greek singer
 November 22 – Dacre Montgomery, Australian actor
 November 24 – Nabil Bentaleb, Algerian footballer
 November 29 
 Julius Randle, American basketball player
 Zhu Ting, Chinese volleyball player

December
 December 3
 Jake T. Austin, American actor 
 Lil Baby, American rapper 
 December 4 – Franco Morbidelli, Italian Grand Prix motorcycle racer
 December 6 – Giannis Antetokounmpo, Greek basketball player
 December 7 – Yuzuru Hanyu, Japanese figure skater
 December 8
 Conseslus Kipruto, Kenyan middle-distance runner
 Raheem Sterling, Jamaican-born English footballer
 December 10 – Lily Owsley, British field hockey player
 December 13 – Laura Flippes, French handball player
 December 16 – Christopher Bell, American racing car driver
 December 17 – Nat Wolff, American actor
 December 18 – Vlada Chigireva, Russian synchronised swimmer
 December 19 
 Katrina Lehis, Estonian fencer
 M'Baye Niang, French-Senegalese footballer
 December 21 – Daniel Amartey, Ghanaian footballer
 December 24 
 Daphne Groeneveld, Dutch model
 Jennifer Valente, American cyclist
 December 26 – Georgia Hirst, English actress
 December 28 – Adam Peaty, English swimmer
 December 30 – Hannah Martin, British field hockey player
 December 31 – Max Bowden, English actor

Deaths

January

 January 1
 Arthur Espie Porritt, New Zealand politician and athlete (b. 1900)
 Cesar Romero, Cuban-American actor (b. 1907) 
 January 3 – Frank Belknap Long, American writer (b. 1901)
 January 4 – R. D. Burman, Indian music composer (b. 1939)
 January 5 – Tip O'Neill, American politician (b. 1912)
 January 7 – Phoumi Vongvichit, President of Laos (b. 1909)
 January 8 – Pat Buttram, American actor (b. 1915)
 January 13 – Johan Jørgen Holst, Norwegian politician and diplomat (b. 1937)
 January 14
 Esther Ralston, American actress (b. 1902)
 Federica Montseny, Spanish politician (b. 1905)
 January 15 – Harry Nilsson, American musician (b. 1941)
 György Cziffra, Hungarian pianist and composer (b. 1921)
 January 17
 Helen Stephens, American runner (b. 1918)
 Chung Il-kwon, South Korean politician (b. 1917)
 January 20
 Matt Busby, Scottish footballer and manager (b. 1909)
 Jaramogi Oginga Odinga, Kenyan politician (b. 1911)
 January 22
 Jean-Louis Barrault, French actor and director (b. 1910)
 Frances Gifford, American actress (b. 1920)
 Telly Savalas, American actor (b. 1922)
 January 23 – Nikolai Ogarkov, Soviet marshal (b. 1917)
 January 25 – Stephen Cole Kleene, American mathematician (b. 1909)
 January 27 – Claude Akins, American actor (b. 1926)
 January 28 – Hal Smith, American actor (b. 1916)
 January 29
 Ulrike Maier, Austrian alpine skier (b. 1967)
 Nick Cravat, American actor and acrobat (b. 1912)
 January 30
 Pierre Boulle, French author (b. 1912)
 Bahjat Talhouni, Jordanian politician (b. 1913)

February

 February 1 – Olan Soule, American actor (b. 1909)
 February 2 – Marija Gimbutas, Lithuanian-American archeologist (b. 1921)
 February 6
 Joseph Cotten, American actor (b. 1905)
 Jack Kirby, American comic book writer and illustrator (b. 1917)
 Luis Alberto Sánchez, Peruvian politician, former Vice President and Prime Minister (b. 1900)
 February 7 – Witold Lutosławski, Polish composer (b. 1913)
 February 9 – Howard Martin Temin, American geneticist (b. 1934)
 February 11
 Sorrell Booke, American actor (b. 1930)
 William Conrad, American actor (b. 1920)
 Paul Feyerabend,  Austrian philosopher (b. 1924)
 Antonio Martín, Spanish cyclist (b. 1970)
 February 12 – Donald Judd, American artist (b. 1928)
 February 14 
 Christopher Lasch, American historian, moralist, and social critic (b. 1932)
 Andrei Chikatilo, Russian serial killer (b. 1936)
 February 19 – Derek Jarman, English film director (b. 1942)
 February 24 – Dinah Shore, American actress and singer (b. 1917)
 February 25
 Baruch Goldstein, American-Israeli physician, religious extremist, and mass murderer (b. 1956)
 Jersey Joe Walcott, American boxer (b. 1914)
 February 26 – Bill Hicks, American comedian (b. 1961)

March

 March 2 – Anita Morris, American actress and singer (b. 1943)
 March 4 – John Candy, Canadian actor and comedian (b. 1950)
 March 5 – Abdullah al-Sallal, 1st President of the Yemen Arab Republic (b. 1917)
 March 6 – Melina Mercouri, Greek actress and politician (b. 1920)
 March 9
 Charles Bukowski, American writer (b. 1920)
 Fernando Rey, Spanish actor (b. 1917)
 March 10 – D. J. M. Mackenzie, New Zealand-born British medical officer (b. 1905)
 March 13 – Danny Barker, American musician (b. 1909)
 March 17
 Ellsworth Vines, American tennis player (b. 1911)
 Mai Zetterling, Swedish actress and director (b. 1925)
 March 21
 Macdonald Carey, American actor (b. 1913)
 Lili Damita, French-American actress and singer (b. 1904)
 Dack Rambo, American actor (b. 1941)
 March 22
 Dan Hartman, American musician (b. 1950)
 Walter Lantz, American cartoonist (b. 1899)
 March 23
 Luis Donaldo Colosio, Mexican politician (b. 1950)
 Giulietta Masina, Italian actress (b. 1921)
 Álvaro del Portillo, Spanish Roman Catholic prelate (b. 1914)
 March 25 – Max Petitpierre, Swiss politician (b. 1899)
 March 26 – Whina Cooper, New Zealand schoolteacher, historian, and activist (b. 1895) 
 March 28
 Eugène Ionesco, Romanian-born playwright (b. 1909)
 Ira Murchison, American athlete (b. 1933)
 March 29 – Bill Travers, English actor (b. 1922)

April 

 April 1
 Léon Degrelle, Belgian politician and Nazi collaborator (b. 1906)
 Robert Doisneau, French photographer (b. 1912)
 April 3 – Jérôme Lejeune, French pediatrician and geneticist (b. 1926)
 April 5 – Kurt Cobain, American singer and songwriter (b. 1967)
 April 6
 Sheck Exley, American cave diver (b. 1949)
 Juvénal Habyarimana, 3rd President of Rwanda (b. 1937)
 Cyprien Ntaryamira, 5th President of Burundi (b. 1955)
 April 7
 Agathe Uwilingiyimana, 4th Prime Minister of Rwanda (b. 1953)
 Albert Guðmundsson, Icelandic footballer and politician (b. 1923)
 Golo Mann, German historian (b. 1909)
 April 9 – Marcel Ichac, French alpinist, explorer, photographer and film director (b. 1906)
 April 13 – Nikolai Kryuchkov, Russian actor (b. 1911)
 April 15 – John Curry, British figure skater (b. 1949)
 April 16 – Ralph Ellison, American writer (b. 1914)
 April 17 – Roger Wolcott Sperry, American neurobiologist (b. 1913)
 April 18 – Ken Oosterbroek, South African photojournalist (b. 1962) 
 April 22 – Richard Nixon, 37th President of the United States (b. 1913)
 April 24 – Masutatsu Ōyama, Korean-Japanese Karate master (b. 1923)
 April 27 – Lynne Frederick, English actress (b. 1954)
 April 29
 Russell Kirk, American political philosopher (b. 1918)
 Marcel Bernard, French tennis champion (b. 1914)
 April 30
 Roland Ratzenberger, Austrian Formula One driver (b. 1960)
 Sorie Ibrahim Koroma, Prime Minister of Sierra Leone (b. 1930)

May

 May 1 – Ayrton Senna, Brazilian Formula One driver (b. 1960)
 May 7 – Clement Greenberg, American art critic (b. 1909)
 May 8 – George Peppard, American actor (b. 1928)
 May 10 – John Wayne Gacy, American serial killer (b. 1942)
 May 12
 Erik Erikson, Danish-American developmental psychologist (b. 1902)
 Roy J. Plunkett, American chemist (b. 1910)
 May 13 – Duncan Hamilton, English racing driver (b. 1920)
 May 15
 Royal Dano, American actor (b. 1922)
 Gilbert Roland, American actor (b. 1905)
 May 16 – Alain Cuny, French actor (b. 1908)
 May 19
 Luis Ocaña, Spanish bicycle racer (b. 1945)
 Jacqueline Kennedy Onassis, American socialite, conservationist, and First Lady of the United States (b. 1929)
 May 21
 Giovanni Goria, Italian Prime Minister (b. 1943)
 Masayoshi Ito, Japanese politician (b. 1913)
 Ralph Miliband, Polish-born British academic (b. 1924)
 May 28 – Julius Boros, American golfer (b. 1920)
 May 29 – Erich Honecker, East German politician (b. 1912)
 May 30
 Ezra Taft Benson, American religious leader (b. 1899)
 Marcel Bich, French businessman (b. 1914)
 Juan Carlos Onetti, Uruguayan novelist (b. 1909)

June

 June 4
 Roberto Burle Marx, Brazilian landscape architect (b. 1909)
 Stephen McNally, American actor (b. 1911)
 Massimo Troisi, Italian actor, screenwriter, and film director (b. 1953)
 June 6
 Mark McManus, Scottish actor (b. 1935)
 Barry Sullivan, American actor (b. 1912)
 June 7 – Dennis Potter, English dramatist (b. 1935)
 June 9 – Jan Tinbergen, Dutch economist (b. 1903)
 June 10 
 Mary Maxwell Gates, American businesswoman (b. 1929)
 Edward Kienholz, American artist and sculptor (b. 1927)
 June 12
 Ron Goldman, American model, waiter, and murder victim (b. 1968)
 Menachem Mendel Schneerson, American Hasidic rabbinical leader (b. 1902)
 Nicole Brown Simpson, German-American actress, waitress (b. 1959)
 June 13 – K. T. Stevens, American actress (b. 1919)
 June 14 – Henry Mancini, American composer and arranger (b. 1924)
 June 15 – Manos Hatzidakis, Greek composer (b. 1925)
 June 16 – Kristen Pfaff, American bassist (b. 1967)
 June 20 – Jay Miner, American computer pioneer (b. 1932)
 June 21 – William Wilson Morgan, American astronomer and astrophysicist (b. 1906)
 June 26 – A. den Doolaard, Dutch writer and journalist (b. 1901)

July

 July 2
 Roberto Balado, Cuban boxer (b. 1969)
 Maung Maung, President of Myanmar (b. 1925)
 July 3 – Lew Hoad, Australian tennis player (b. 1934)
 July 7
 Anita Garvin, American actress (b. 1907) 
 Friedrich August Freiherr von der Heydte, German Luftwaffe officer (b. 1907)
 Cameron Mitchell, American actor (b. 1918)
 July 8
 Christian-Jaque, French film director (b. 1904)
 Kim Il-sung, President of North Korea (b. 1912)
 Dick Sargent, American actor (b. 1930)
 July 11 – Gary Kildall, American computer inventor (b. 1942)
 July 16 – Julian Schwinger, American physicist (b. 1918)
 July 17 – Jean Borotra, French tennis player (b. 1898)
 July 20 – Paul Delvaux, Belgian painter (b. 1897)
 July 21 – Pere Calders, Spanish writer and cartoonist (b. 1912)
 July 27 – Kevin Carter, South African photojournalist (b. 1960)
 July 29 – Dorothy Hodgkin, British chemist (b. 1910)

August

 August 3 – Innokenty Smoktunovsky, Russian actor (b. 1925)
 August 4 – Giovanni Spadolini, Italian Prime Minister (b. 1925)
 August 6 – Domenico Modugno, Italian singer-songwriter and actor turned politician (b. 1928)
 August 11 – Peter Cushing, English actor (b. 1913)
 August 13 – Manfred Wörner, German politician and diplomat (b. 1934)
 August 14 – Elias Canetti, Bulgarian-born writer (b. 1905)
 August 16 – John Doucette, American actor (b. 1921)
 August 17 – Jack Sharkey, American boxer (b. 1902)
 August 18 – Richard Laurence Millington Synge, English chemist (b. 1914)
 August 19 
 Linus Pauling, American chemist (b. 1901)
 Robert Rozhdestvensky, Soviet poet (b. 1932)
 August 20 – Aleksandar Petrović, French film director (b. 1929)
 August 21 – Anita Lizana, Chilean tennis champion (b. 1915)
 August 23 – Zoltán Fábri, Hungarian film director (b. 1917)
 August 27 – Roberto Goyeneche, Argentine tango singer (b. 1926)
 August 30 – Lindsay Anderson, British film director (b. 1923)

September

 September 3 – Billy Wright, English footballer (b. 1924)
 September 5 – Shimshon Amitsur, Israeli mathematician (b. 1921)
 September 6
 Nicky Hopkins, British musician (b. 1944)
 Duccio Tessari, Italian director and screenwriter (b. 1926)
 Paul Xuereb, Maltese politician (b. 1923)
 September 7
 James Clavell, British writer (b. 1921)
 Dennis Morgan, American actor and singer (b. 1908)
 Terence Young, British film director (b. 1915)
 September 8 – János Szentágothai, Hungarian anatomist (b. 1912)
 September 9 – Patrick O'Neal, American actor (b. 1927)
 September 11 – Jessica Tandy, English-born American actress (b. 1909)
 September 12
 Tom Ewell, American actor and producer (b. 1909)
 Boris Yegorov, Russian cosmonaut (b. 1937)
 September 15 – Mark Stevens, American actor (b. 1916)
 September 17
 Vitas Gerulaitis, American tennis player (b. 1954)
 Karl Popper, Austrian-British philosopher (b. 1902)
 September 18 – Franco Moschino, Italian fashion designer (b. 1950)
 September 19 – Joseph Iléo, Prime Minister of the Democratic Republic of the Congo (b. 1921)
 September 20 – Jule Styne, English-born American songwriter (b. 1905)
 September 23 – Robert Bloch, American writer (b. 1917)
 September 26 – Louis Ferdinand, Prince of Prussia (b. 1907)
 September 27 – Carlos Lleras Restrepo, President of Colombia (b. 1908)
 September 30
 André Michel Lwoff, French microbiologist (b. 1902)
 Roberto Eduardo Viola, military president of Argentina (b. 1924)

October

 October 2 – Harriet Nelson, American actress (b. 1909)
 October 3 – Dub Taylor, American actor (b. 1907)
 October 7
 Niels Kaj Jerne, English immunologist (b. 1911)
 James Hill, British film and television director (b. 1919)
 October 9 – Raich Carter, English sportsman (b. 1913)
 October 15 – Sarah Kofman, French philosopher (b. 1934)
 October 19 
 Oldřich Černík, Prime Minister of Czechoslovakia (b. 1921)
 Martha Raye, American actress and comedian (b. 1916)
 October 20
 Sergei Bondarchuk, Russian film director (b. 1920)
 Burt Lancaster, American actor (b. 1913)
 October 23 – Robert Lansing, American actor (b. 1928)
 October 24 – Raul Julia, Puerto Rican-American actor and singer (b. 1940)
 October 25 – Mildred Natwick, American actress (b. 1905)
 October 29 – Shlomo Goren, Israeli rabbi (b. 1918)

November

 November 1 – Noah Beery Jr., American actor (b. 1913)
 November 2 – Grisha Filipov, 38th Prime Minister of Bulgaria (b. 1919)
 November 4 – Sam Francis, American painter (b. 1923)
 November 10 – Carmen McRae, American jazz singer (b. 1922)
 November 11 – Dame Elizabeth Maconchy, British composer (b. 1907)
 November 12
 Wilma Rudolph, American athlete (b. 1940)
 J. I. M. Stewart, Scottish novelist (b. 1906)
 November 13
 Vladimir Ivashko, Ukrainian Soviet Communist politician (b. 1932)
 Motoo Kimura, Japanese geneticist (b. 1924)
 November 14 – Tom Villard, American actor (b. 1953)
 November 18 – Cab Calloway, American jazz singer and bandleader (b. 1907)
 November 19 – Julian Symons, British crime writer and poet (b. 1912)
 November 21 – Willem Jacob Luyten, Dutch-American astronomer (b. 1899)
 November 23 – Alberto Natusch, Bolivian general, 55th President of Bolivia (b. 1933)
 November 28
 Jeffrey Dahmer, American serial killer (b. 1960)
 Vicente Enrique y Tarancón, Spanish cardinal (b. 1907)
 November 30
 Guy Debord, French theorist, writer, and filmmaker (b. 1931)
 Lionel Stander, American actor (b. 1908)

December

 December 4 – Julio Ramón Ribeyro, Peruvian writer (b. 1929)
 December 6 – Gian Maria Volonté, Italian actor (b. 1933)
 December 8
 Antônio Carlos Jobim, Brazilian composer (b. 1927)
 Enrique Líster, Spanish communist politician and military officer (b. 1907)
 December 9 – Max Bill, Swiss architect and artist (b. 1908)
 December 10 – Alex Wilson, Canadian athlete (b. 1905)
 December 11 – Stanisław Maczek, Polish general (b. 1892)
 December 12 – Stuart Roosa, American astronaut (b. 1933)
 December 13 – Antoine Pinay, French politician, former Prime Minister (b. 1891)
 December 18 – Lilia Skala, Austrian-born American actress (b. 1896)
 December 20 – Dean Rusk, American diplomat, 54th Secretary of State (b. 1909)
 December 23 – Sebastian Shaw, English actor (b. 1905)
 December 24
 John Boswell, American historian (b. 1947)
 Rossano Brazzi, Italian actor (b. 1916)
 John Osborne, English playwright (b. 1929)
 December 25 – Zail Singh, 7th President of India (b. 1916)
 December 26 
 Karl Schiller, German economist and politician (b. 1911)
 Sylva Koscina, Italian-Croatian actress (b. 1933)
 December 31 – Woody Strode, American athlete and actor (b. 1914)

Nobel Prizes

 Physics – Bertram Brockhouse, Clifford Shull
 Chemistry – George Andrew Olah
 Medicine – Alfred G. Gilman, Martin Rodbell
 Literature – Kenzaburō Ōe
 Peace – Yasser Arafat, Shimon Peres, Yitzhak Rabin
 Nobel Memorial Prize in Economic Sciences – Reinhard Selten, John Forbes Nash Jr., John Harsanyi

Templeton Prize
 Michael Novak

Fields Medal
 Efim Zelmanov, Pierre-Louis Lions, Jean Bourgain, Jean-Christophe Yoccoz

Right Livelihood Award
 Astrid Lindgren, SERVOL (Service Volunteered for All), H. Sudarshan / VGKK (Vivekananda Girijana Kalyana Kendra), Ken Saro-Wiwa / MOSOP (Movement for the Survival of the Ogoni People)

References